Karpuzkaya, historically and still informally called Telhüyük, is a village in the Şehitkamil District, Gaziantep Province, Turkey. The village is inhabited by Turkmens of the Qiziq tribe and had a population of 416 in 2021.

References

Villages in Şehitkamil District